Events from the year 2011 in Austria

Incumbents 

 President: Heinz Fischer
 Chancellor: Werner Faymann

Governors 

 Burgenland: Hans Niessl
 Carinthia: Gerhard Dörfler
 Lower Austria: Erwin Pröll
 Salzburg: Gabi Burgstaller
 Styria: Franz Voves
 Tyrol: Günther Platter
 Upper Austria: Josef Pühringer
 Vienna: Michael Häupl
 Vorarlberg:
 Herbert Sausgruber (till 7 December 2011)
 Markus Wallner (since 7 December 2011)

Events

Births

Deaths

References 

 
Years of the 21st century in Austria
Austria
Austria
2010s in Austria